Tavakkol or Tavakol may refer to:
 Tavakkol, Kurdistan
 Tavakkol, Mazandaran
 Tavakkol, Hirmand, Sistan and Baluchestan Province
 Tavakkol, Qasr-e Qand, Sistan and Baluchestan Province